2016 Commonwealth of Independent States Cup was the 24th annual Commonwealth of Independent States Cup since its establishment in 1993. It was hosted in Saint Petersburg, Russia between 17 and 23 January 2016.

Saint Petersburg hosted the event for the seventh time, with all matches being held in a single venue (Saint Petersburg Sports and Concert Complex). All participating nations were represented by their youth (U20/U21) national teams.

Format
This edition sees a reduction in sides to eight Under 21 teams.  The number of participants was reduced from 12 to 8, split in two groups of four. Group winners advanced to the final match, while the rest of the teams decided overall 3rd, 5th and 7th places in a single knockout round.

Participants
The following 8 teams, shown with age of youth national team, took part in the tournament:

Group stage
All subsequent times UTC+3

Group A

Kyrgyzstan placed above Belarus by better head-to-head result

Results

Group B

Results

Final round

Seventh-place match

Fifth-place match

Third-place match

Final

Final standing

Top scorers

References

External links 
 Official website
 Russian Football Union Official web-site 

2015–16 in Russian football
2016 in Saint Petersburg
2015
January 2016 sports events in Russia